High Art is a 1998 independent romantic drama written and directed by Lisa Cholodenko, and starring Ally Sheedy and Radha Mitchell. It premiered at the 1998 Sundance Film Festival, where it won the Waldo Salt Screenwriting Award, and saw a limited release in the United States on June 12, 1998.

The film received largely positive reviews from critics, with particular praise for Sheedy's performance, which earned several accolades, including the Independent Spirit Award for Best Female Lead, the Los Angeles Film Critics Association Award for Best Actress and the National Society of Film Critics Award for Best Actress.

Synopsis
Sydney (or simply "Syd"), age 24, is a woman who has her whole life mapped out in front of her. Living with longtime boyfriend James, and working her way up at the respected high-art photography magazine Frame, Syd has desires and frustrations that seem typical and manageable. But when a crack in her ceiling springs a leak and Syd finds herself knocking on the door of her upstairs neighbor, a chance meeting suddenly takes her on a new path.

Opening the door to an uncharted world for Syd is Lucy Berliner, a renowned photographer, enchanting, elusive, and curiously retired. Now 40, Lucy lives with her once glamorous, heroin-addicted German girlfriend Greta, and plays host to a collection of hard-living party kids. Syd is fascinated by Lucy and becomes drawn into the center of Lucy's strangely alluring life upstairs.

Syd mentions Lucy to her bosses (without realising that she is famous) but they remain uninterested until they realise exactly who Lucy is. At a lunch, Lucy agrees to work for the magazine as long as Syd is her editor. Soon a working relationship develops between the two and a project is underway which promises a second chance for Lucy's career. But as Syd and Lucy's collaboration draws them closer together, their working relationship turns sexual and the lines between love and professionalism suddenly blur. As Syd slowly discovers the darker truths of Lucy's life on the edge, she is forced to confront her own hunger for recognition and the uncertain rewards of public esteem.

Cast

Production notes
The photography by Lucy Berliner (Sheedy) was based on Nan Goldin's work. The photographs were made by Jojo Whilden.

Reception

Release 
The film premiered at the 1998 Sundance Film Festival to rave reviews.

Critical response 
On Rotten Tomatoes, the film holds an approval rating of 76%, based on 49 reviews, and an average rating of 6.8/10. The site's critics consensus reads, "A surprisingly sultry performance from Ally Sheedy elevates High Art from pretentious melodrama to compelling -- if still a little pretentious -- romance." On Metacritic, High Art has a score of 73 based on 17 reviews, indicating "generally favorable reviews". 

Film critic Roger Ebert praised the film as "masterful", noting "High Art is so perceptive and mature it makes similar films seem flippant. The performances are on just the right note, scene after scene, for what needs to be done." 

Emanuel Levy of Variety wrote, "The beauty of Cholodenko’s writing is that she etches the evolving friendship, and the transformation of the two women, step by step, without any cheating," and that she "painstakingly dissects the culture of heroin chic and its implications." Of Sheedy, Levy wrote after years of "’80s teen-angst movies, [she] shakes up her old screen image entirely and emerges as a mature, highly disciplined actress." Levy noted "Clarkson excels in portraying an aging, disenchanted actress, desperately clinging to Lucy – and to drugs", and singled out Mitchell as the film's "real revelation", saying "her scenes with Sheedy are so truthfully touching."

Janet Maslin of The New York Times praised the performances, but said the ending is one of "contrived inevitability."

IndieWire listed it as #7 of The 15 Greatest Lesbian Movies of All Time. In 2022, Autostraddle listed it as #58 of The 200 Best Lesbian Movies of All Time.

Awards and nominations

See also
 List of LGBT films directed by women

References

External links
 Official site
 
 
 

1998 films
1998 LGBT-related films
American romantic drama films
American LGBT-related films
Bisexuality-related films
English-language Canadian films
1990s English-language films
American independent films
Lesbian-related films
1998 romantic drama films
Films directed by Lisa Cholodenko
Canadian LGBT-related films
1998 directorial debut films
1990s American films
1990s Canadian films
Sundance Film Festival award winners
1998 independent films
Films about photographers
Films about heroin addiction